Georg Lindner (born 20 January 1983 in Austria) is an alpine skier from Austria but now competes for Moldova. He competed for Moldova at the 2014 Winter Olympics in the super-G event where he did not finish the race.

Although born in Austria, Lindner elected to compete for Moldova from 2009, as a naturalized Moldovan citizen.

References 

1983 births
Austrian male alpine skiers
Moldovan male alpine skiers
Alpine skiers at the 2014 Winter Olympics
Olympic alpine skiers of Moldova
Living people